Reka Zsofia Lazăr-Szabo (born 11 March 1967) is a Romanian foil fencer, bronze medallist in the 1992 Summer Olympics, World champion in 1994, and silver medallist at the 1996 Summer Olympics.

Career
She is of Hungarian-ethnic background. Lazăr-Szabo began fencing when she was 7 years old at CS Tractorul in her hometown Brașov. Her elder brother already fenced there. When her father announced to coach Petre Dumitrescu he had to withdraw his son because he could not leave his daughter at home without supervision, Dumitrescu suggested he bring the girl as well. After a few weeks of watching her brother train, she took an interest in the sport. Her first coaches were Bogdan Pincovici, then Vlad Șerban. At the age of 12 she won her first national championship.

In 1983 she won the Romanian Cup and joined the national senior team. The same year, she took part in her first international competition at the Minsk Junior World Cup. She ranked in the Top 16 at her first Junior World Championships in Leningrad. A year later, in 1985, she reached the final of the Junior World Championships in Arnhem and came away with a silver medal. She won the Junior World title in 1986 at Stuttgart. She made her Olympic début at Seoul 1988, but she was defeated in the second round in the individual event and in the first round in the team event.

In 1989 she married Vilmoș Szabo, bronze medallist in men's team sabre at the 1984 Summer Olympics, also a member of the Hungarian minority in Romania. In the 1992 Summer Olympics in Atlanta she won a team bronze medal along with Claudia Grigorescu, Elisabeta Guzganu-Tufan, Laura Badea and Roxana Dumitrescu. Her husband and her moved to Germany in 1993; he became a fencing coach at TSV Bayer Dormagen, which became her club. She took the gold medal both in the individual and team events at the 1994 World Championships in Atlanta. Two years later, she earned a silver Olympic medal with the team.

Lazăr-Szabo retired from competition in 2004, after 21 years spent in the national team, after missing the qualification for the 2004 Summer Olympics. Her eldest son Matyas, born in 1991, took up fencing because their parents were always at the fencing hall; he is now a member of Germany's senior sabre team and won with them the 2014 World Championships. She stopped her coaching activities after her second son, Marc, was born.

Lazăr-Szabo was inducted in 2013 in the Hall of Fame of the International Fencing Federation.

References

External links
 

1967 births
Living people
Romanian female fencers
Romanian sportspeople of Hungarian descent
Olympic fencers of Romania
Fencers at the 1988 Summer Olympics
Fencers at the 1992 Summer Olympics
Fencers at the 1996 Summer Olympics
Fencers at the 2000 Summer Olympics
Olympic silver medalists for Romania
Olympic bronze medalists for Romania
Sportspeople from Brașov
Olympic medalists in fencing
Medalists at the 1992 Summer Olympics
Medalists at the 1996 Summer Olympics
Romanian fencing coaches
Universiade medalists in fencing
Universiade bronze medalists for Romania